The jet manakin (Chloropipo unicolor) is a species of bird in the family Pipridae. It is found in Ecuador and Peru. Its natural habitat is subtropical or tropical moist montane forest.

References

jet manakin
Birds of the Ecuadorian Andes
Birds of the Peruvian Andes
jet manakin
jet manakin
Taxonomy articles created by Polbot